Vallikkode may refer to:

 Vallicode, Pathanamthitta, India. 
 Vellicode, Kanyakumari, India. 
 Vallicode-Kottayam, Pathanamthitta, India